Friday Night Games was a spin-off from Big Brother Australias Friday Night Live, hosted by Mike Goldman (Blue Coordinator only in the Grand Final) with Bree Amer (Green Coordinator) and Ryan "Fitzy" Fitzgerald (Yellow Coordinator) and was produced at Dreamworld, Gold Coast, Australia by Network Ten.

Two teams, each composed of three celebrities and one chosen contestant (dubbed the "celeb-to-be"), competed and tested their skills in a series of games and challenges. Each game had a different set of rules and difficulty rating.

The "celeb-to-be" was chosen out of hundreds of applicants, most being eliminated through challenges until a final challenge on the Friday Night Games set. Challenges included holding onto a balloon whilst riding "Wipeout", or holding a piece of paper above their head whilst riding on the Tower Of Terror, a roller coaster at Dreamworld, without ripping it.

During each Game there would be a referee (or ref for short) which the crowd booed at. At the grand final the ref was booed off stage and The ref Gave the crowd The Finger.However this was edited out.

Each episode was pre-recorded in front of a live audience at Dreamworld’s games arena and aired on Friday nights. The ultimate Friday Night Games Champion Team won a A$50,000 donation to the charity of their choice, courtesy of Supercheap Auto.

Episodes
The winner of each episode is marked in Bold'.

The Brunettes, consisting of Patrick Harvey, Craig Lowndes, team captain Ricki-Lee Coulter and Celeb-to-be Karyn, were the winners of the series. They chose to give the $50,000 to Beyond Blue.

References

External links
 

2006 Australian television series debuts
2006 Australian television series endings
2000s Australian game shows
Network 10 original programming
Australian television spin-offs
Television series by Endemol Australia
Television series by Endemol